Wu Zetian (17 February 624 – 16 December 705), personal name Wu Zhao, was the de facto ruler of the Tang dynasty from 665 to 705, ruling first through others and then (from 690) in her own right. From 665 to 690, she was first empress consort of the Tang dynasty (as wife of the Emperor Gaozong) and then, after his death, empress dowager (ruling through her sons Emperors Zhongzong and Ruizong). Unprecedented in Chinese history, she subsequently founded and ruled as empress regnant of the Wu Zhou dynasty of China from 690 to 705. She was the only female sovereign in the history of China widely regarded as legitimate. Under her 40-year reign, China grew larger, becoming one of the great powers of the world, its culture and economy were revitalized, and corruption in the court was reduced. She was removed from power in a coup and died a few months later.

In early life, Wu was the concubine of Emperor Taizong. After his death, she married his ninth son and successor, Emperor Gaozong, officially becoming Gaozong's huanghou, or empress consort, the highest-ranking of the wives, in 655. Even before becoming empress consort, Wu had considerable political power. Once announced as the empress consort, she began to control the court, and after Gaozong's debilitating stroke in 660, she became administrator of the court, a position equal to the emperor's, until 705. As a young woman entering Emperor Gaozong's harem, she clashed with Empress Wang and Consort Xiao to gain the emperor's affection, and eventually expelled and killed them. After her wedding to Gaozong in 655, Empress Wu's rise to power was swift. A strong, charismatic, vengeful, ambitious and well-educated woman who enjoyed the absolute affection of her husband, Wu was the most powerful and influential woman at court during a period when the Tang Empire was at the peak of its glory. 

She was more decisive and proactive than her husband, and historians consider her to have been the real power behind the throne during Emperor Gaozong's reign for more than 20 years until his death. She was partially in control of power from November 660, and totally from January 665. History records that: "She was at the helm of the country for long years, her power is no different from that of the emperor." Empress Wu presided over the court with the emperor, and even held court independently when the emperor was unwell. She was given charge of the Heirloom Seal of the Realm, implying that her perusal and consent were necessary before any document or order received legal validity. Gaozong sought her views on all matters before issuing orders. Wu was granted certain honors and privileges not enjoyed by any Chinese empresses before or since. After Gaozong's death, Empress Wu as empress dowager and regent held power completely and solely, used absolute power more forcefully and violently than before, and suppressed her overt and covert opponents. Seven years later, she seized the throne and began the Zhou dynasty, becoming the only empress regnant in Chinese history.

Empress Wu is considered one of the greatest emperors in Chinese history due to her strong leadership and effective governance, which made China one of the world's most powerful nations. The importance to history of her period of political and military leadership includes the major expansion of the Chinese empire, extending it far beyond its previous territorial limits, deep into Central Asia, and engaging in a series of wars on the Korean Peninsula, first allying with Silla against Goguryeo, and then against Silla over the occupation of former Goguryeo territory. Within China, besides the more direct consequences of her struggle to gain and maintain supreme power, Wu's leadership resulted in important effects regarding social class in Chinese society and in relation to state support for Taoism, Buddhism, education, and literature. 

Wu developed a network of spies to build a strong intelligence system in the court and throughout the empire, delivering daily reports on current affairs of the empire or opposition to the central state. She also played a key role in reforming the imperial examination system and encouraging capable officials to work in governance to maintain a peaceful and well-governed state. Effectively, these reforms improved her nation's bureaucracy by placing competence, rather than family connection, at the centre of the civil service. Wu also had a monumental impact upon the statuary of the Longmen Grottoes and the "Wordless Stele" at the Qianling Mausoleum, as well as the construction of some major buildings and bronze castings that no longer survive. Besides her career as a political leader, Wu also had an active family life. She was a mother of four sons, three of whom also carried the title of emperor, although one held that title only as a posthumous honor. One of her grandsons became the renowned Emperor Xuanzong of Tang.

Names and titles 

In Chinese history and literature, Wu Zetian was known by various names and titles. Mention of her in the English language has only increased their number. A difficulty in English translations is that they tend to specify gender (as in the case of "emperor" versus "empress" or "prince" versus "princess"), whereas, in Classical Chinese, words such as hou ("sovereign", "prince", "queen") or huangdi , "imperial supreme ruler", "royal deity") are of grammatically indeterminate gender.

Names 
In Wu's time, women's birth names were rarely recorded. Wu was her patronymic surname, which she retained, according to traditional Chinese practice, after marriage to Gaozong, of the Li family. Emperor Taizong gave her the art name Wu Mei, meaning "glamorous". Thus, Chinese people often refer to her as Wu Mei or Wu Meiniang when they write about her youth, as Wu Hou when referring to her as empress consort and empress dowager, and as Wu Zetian when referring to her as empress regnant.

Titles  
During her life, and posthumously, Wu was awarded various official titles. Both hou and huangdi are titles (modifications, or added characters to hou are of lesser importance). Born Wu Zhao, she is not properly known as "Wu Hou" (Empress Wu) until receiving this title in 655, nor is she properly known as "Wu Zetian", her regnal name, until 690, when she took the title Emperor.

 During the reign of Emperor Gaozu of Tang (618-626): 
 Lady Wu (from 624)
 During the reign of Emperor Taizong of Tang (626-649):
 Talented Lady (from 637), 17th rank consort
 During the reign of Emperor Gaozong of Tang (649-683): 
 Imperial Concubine Zhaoyi (from 650), 6th rank consort                                        
 Empress (from 655), 1st rank consort   
 Heavenly Empress (from 674), 1st rank consort
 During the reign of Emperor Zhongzong of Tang (684-684): 
 Empress Dowager Wu (from 683)
 During the reign of Emperor Ruizong of Tang (684-690) 
 Empress Dowager Wu (from 684)
During her reign as the Empress Regnant of the Zhou Dynasty (690-705):
 Holy Emperor (from 690)
 Holy Golden Emperor (from 693)
 Holy Golden Goddess Emperor (from 694)
 Holy Golden Emperor (from 695)
 Emperor Tiance Jinlun (from 695)
 Emperor Zetian Dasheng (from 705)
 During the second reign of Emperor Zhongzong of Tang (705-710):                                                              
 Empress Zetian Dasheng (from 705)
During the second reign of Emperor Ruizong of Tang (710-712):                                                
 Heavenly Empress (from 710)               
 Holy Empress (from 710)   
 Empress of Heaven (from 712)
Holy Empress (from 712)
During the reign of Emperor Xuanzong of Tang (713-756):                                                      
Empress Zetian (from 716)  
Holy Empress Zetianshun (from 749)

"Empress" 

Various Chinese titles have been translated into English as "empress", including "empress" in both the sense of empress consort and empress regnant. Generally, the monarch was male and his chief spouse was given a title such as huanghou, often translated as "empress" or more specific "empress consort". Upon the emperor's death, the surviving empress consort could become empress dowager, sometimes wielding considerable political power as regent during the minority of the (male) heir to the position of emperor.

Since the time of Qin Shi Huang (259–210 BC), the Emperor of China using the title huangdi (translated as "emperor" or "empress (regnant)" as appropriate), Wu was the only woman in the history of China to assume the title huangdi. Her tenure as de facto ruler of China and official regent of the Tang dynasty (first through her husband and then through her sons, from 665 to 690) was not without precedent in Chinese history, but she broke precedent when she founded her own dynasty in 690, the Zhou (interrupting the Tang dynasty), ruling personally under the name Sacred and Divine Huangdi, and variations thereof, from 690 to 705.

Wu Zetian and Empress Dowager Liu of the Song Dynasty are said to be the only women in Chinese history to have worn a yellow robe, ordinarily reserved for the emperor's sole use, as a monarch or co-ruler in their own right.

Background and early life 

The Wu family clan originated in Wenshui County, Bingzhou (an ancient name of the city of Taiyuan, Shanxi). Wu Zetian's birthplace is not documented in preserved historical literature and remains disputed. Some scholars argue that Wu was born in Wenshui, some that it was Lizhou (modern-day Guangyuan in Sichuan), while others insist she was born in the imperial capital of Chang'an (today known as Xi'an).

Wu Zetian was born in the seventh year of the reign of Emperor Gaozu of Tang. In the same year, a total eclipse of the sun was visible across China. Her father, Wu Shiyue, worked in the timber business and the family was relatively well off. Her mother was from the powerful Yang family. During the final years of Emperor Yang of Sui, Li Yuan (who went on to become Emperor Gaozu of Tang) stayed in the Wu household many times and became close to the Wu family while holding appointments in both Hedong and Taiyuan. After Li Yuan overthrew Emperor Yang, he was generous to the Wu family, giving them money, grain, land, and clothing. Once the Tang dynasty became established, Wu Shihou held a succession of senior ministerial posts, including governor of Yangzhou, Lizhou, and Jingzhou (modern-day Jiangling County, Hubei).

Wu was from a wealthy family, and was encouraged by her father to read books and pursue her education. He made sure that she was well-educated, an uncommon trait among women, much less encouraged by their fathers. Wu read and learned about many topics, such as politics and other governmental affairs, writing, literature, and music. At age 14, she was taken to be an imperial concubine (lesser wife) of Emperor Taizong of Tang. It was there that she became a type of secretary. This opportunity allowed her to continue to pursue her education. She was given the title of cairen, the title for one of the consorts with the fifth rank in Tang's nine-rank system for imperial officials, nobles, and consorts. When she was summoned to the palace, her mother, the Lady Yang, wept bitterly when saying farewell to her, but she responded, "How do you know that it is not my fortune to meet the Son of Heaven?" Lady Yang reportedly then understood her ambitions, and therefore stopped crying.

Consort Wu, however, did not appear to be much favored by Emperor Taizong, although it appeared that she did have sexual relations with him at one point. According to her own account (given in a rebuke of Chancellor Ji Xu during her reign), she once impressed Taizong with her fortitude:

When Taizong died in 649, his youngest son, Li Zhi, whose mother was the main wife Wende, succeeded him as Emperor Gaozong. Li Zhi had had an affair with Wu when Taizong was still alive.

Taizong had 14 sons, including three by his beloved Empress Zhangsun (601–636), but none with Consort Wu. Thus, according to the custom by which consorts of deceased emperors who had not produced children were permanently confined to a monastic institution after the emperor's death, Wu was consigned to Ganye Temple with the expectation that she would serve as a Buddhist nun there for the remainder of her life. But Wu defied expectations and left the convent for an alternative life. After Taizong's death, Li Zhi came to visit her and, finding her more beautiful, intelligent, and intriguing than before, decided to bring her back as his own concubine.

Rise to power 

By early 650, Consort Wu was a concubine of Emperor Gaozong, and had the title Zhaoyi (the highest-ranking of the nine concubines in the second rank). She progressed rapidly, earning the title of huanghou (皇后) (empress consort, the highest rank and position a woman held in the empire), and gradually gained immeasurable influence and unprecedented authority over the empire's governance throughout Gaozong's reign. Over time, she came to control most major and key decisions made during Gaozong's reign, and presided over imperial gatherings. After Gaozong died in 683, Empress Wu became the empress dowager and regent and power fell completely and solely into the her hands. She proceeded to depose Emperor Zhongzong for displaying independence and held onto power even more firmly thereafter. She then had her youngest son, Ruizong, made emperor. She was absolute ruler not only in substance but in appearance. She presided alone over imperial gatherings, prevented Ruizong from taking an any active role in governance, and forbade all meetings with him. In 690, she had Ruizong yield the throne to her and established the Zhou Dynasty. She ruled as emperor until 705. She was regarded as ruthless in her endeavors to grab power, and was believed by traditional historians to have killed her own children. This was later proven false; these rumors seem to have surfaced 400 years after her death, likely due to the belief in ancient China that a woman was unsuited to hold the power of the emperor. But the cause of death of her first two children is still in question.

Imperial consort

Palatial intrigue: (650–655) 
Gaozong became emperor at the age of 21. He was not the first choice, as he was inexperienced and frequently incapacitated with a sickness that caused him spells of dizziness. Gaozong was made heir to the empire only due to the disgrace of his two older brothers. On or after the anniversary of Emperor Taizong's death, Gaozong went to Ganye Temple to offer incense. When he and Consort Wu saw each other, they both wept. This was seen by Gaozong's wife, Empress Wang. At that time, Gaozong did not favor Wang. Instead, he favored his concubine Consort Xiao. Furthermore, Wang had no children, and Xiao had one son (Li Sujie) and two daughters (Princesses Yiyang and Xuancheng). Wang, seeing that Gaozong was still impressed by Wu's beauty, hoped that the arrival of a new concubine would divert the emperor from Xiao. Therefore, she secretly told Wu to stop shaving her hair and later welcomed her to the palace. (Some modern historians dispute this traditional account. Some think that Wu never left the imperial palace and might have had an affair with Gaozong while Taizong was still alive.)

Wu soon overtook Xiao as Gaozong's favorite. In 652, she gave birth to her first child, a son named Li Hong. In 653, she gave birth to another son, Li Xián. Neither of these sons was in contention to be Gaozong's heir, because Gaozong, at the request of officials influenced by Wang and her uncle (the chancellor Liu Shi), had designated his eldest son Li Zhong as his heir. Li Zhong's mother, Consort Liu, was of lowly birth. Wang did this in order to receive Liu's gratitude.

By 654, both Wang and Xiao had lost favor with Gaozong, and these two former romantic rivals joined forces against Wu, but to no avail. For example, as a sign of his love for Wu, Gaozong conferred posthumous honors on her father, Wu Shiyue, in 654.

In the same year, Wu gave birth to a daughter. But her daughter died shortly after birth, with evidence suggesting deliberate strangulation. The evidence include allegations made by Wu herself, and she accused Wang of murder. Wang was accused of having been seen near the child's room, with corroborating testimony by alleged eyewitnesses. Gaozong was led to believe that Wang, motivated by jealousy, had most likely killed the child. Wang lacked an alibi and was unable to clear her name.

Scientifically credible forensic pathology information about the death of Wu's daughter does not exist, and scholars lack concrete evidence about her death. But scholars have many theories and speculations. Because traditional folklore tends to portray Wu as a power-hungry woman unconcerned about whom she hurt or what she did, the most popular theory is that Wu killed her own child in order to implicate Wang. Other schools of thought argue that Wang indeed killed the child out of jealousy and hatred of Wu. The third argument is that the child died of asphyxiation or crib death. The ventilation systems of the time were nonexistent or of poor quality, and the lack of ventilation combined with using coal as a heating method could have led to carbon monoxide poisoning. In any case, Wu blamed Wang for the girl's death, and as a result, tried to remove Wang from her position.

Because of the child's death, an angry Gaozong also wanted to depose Wang and replace her with Wu. But first he needed to make sure that he had the support of the government chancellors. So Gaozong met with his uncle Zhangsun Wuji, the head chancellor. During the meeting, Gaozong repeatedly brought Wang's childlessness. Childlessness was a sufficient excuse to depose Wang. But Zhangsun repeatedly found ways to divert the conversation. Subsequent visits made by Wu's mother, Lady Yang, and an official allied with Wu, Xu Jingzong, to seek support from Zhangsun were met with disappointment. Early in 655, he wanted to create Wu, who carried the sixth-highest rank among imperial consorts, Zhaoyi (昭儀), the unprecedented title of Chenfei (宸妃), and promote her over all other imperial consorts directly under Wang herself, but Han and fellow chancellor Lai Ji both opposed on the grounds that the title was unprecedented, and so Gaozong did not carry it out.

In summer 655, Wu accused Wang and her mother, Lady Liu, of using witchcraft. In response, Gaozong barred Liu from the palace and demoted Wang's uncle, Liu Shi. Meanwhile, a faction of officials began to form around Wu, including Li Yifu, Xu, Cui Yixuan, and Yuan Gongyu. Once in the autumn of 655, Gaozong summoned the chancellors Zhangsun, Li Ji, Yu Zhining, and Chu Suiliang to the palace. Chu had deduced that the summons was about changing the empress. Li Ji claimed illness and refused to attend. At the meeting, Chu vehemently opposed deposing Wang, while Zhangsun and Yu showed their disapproval by silence. Meanwhile, chancellors Han Yuan and Lai Ji also opposed the move. When Gaozong asked Li Ji again, he responded, "This is your family matter, Your Imperial Majesty. Why ask anyone else?" Gaozong therefore became resolved. He demoted Chu to commandant at Tan Prefecture (roughly modern Changsha, Hunan), and then deposed both Wang and Xiao. He placed them both under arrest and made Wu empress. (Later that year, Gaozong showed signs of considering their release. Because of this, Wang and Xiao were killed on Empress Wu's orders. After their deaths, they often haunted Wu's dreams.)

For the rest of Gaozong's reign, Wu and Gaozong often took up residence at the eastern capital Luoyang and only infrequently spent time in Chang'an.

Empress consort

Involvement in politics: (655–660) 
In 655, Wu became Tang Gaozong's new empress consort (húanghòu). Empress Wu was a powerful force in the world of politics. Emperor Gaozong's was putty in her hands when she wanted something done. After Empress Wu's ascension, one of the first things that the did as new empress, submitted a petition ostensibly praising the faithfulness of Han and Lai in opposing the unprecedented Chenfei title, but showing instead that she remembered that they had offended her — her petition that, however, made Han and Lai apprehensive that she was aware of their opposition of her, and Han offered to resign thereafter, an offer that Emperor Gaozong did not accept.

In 656, on the advice of Xu Jingzong, Emperor Gaozong deposed Consort Liu's son Li Zhong from being his heir apparent. He changed Li Zhong's status to Prince of Liang and designated Empress Wu's son, Li Hong as the title of Prince of Dai and crown prince (that is, Heir Apparent). Soon after, Empress Wu soon became dominant at court, installing officials who favored her ascension in chancellor posts.

In 657, Empress Wu persuaded Emperor Gaozong to split the empire into two capitals and make Luoyang the capital alongside Chang'an. In 657, Empress Wu and her allies began reprisals against officials who had opposed her ascension. She first had Xu and Li Yifu, who were by now chancellors, falsely accuse Han Yuan and Lai Ji of being complicit with Chu Suiliang in planning treason. The three of them, along with Liu Shi, were demoted to being prefects of remote prefectures, with provisions that they would never be allowed to return to Chang'an. In 659, she had Xu accuse Zhangsun Wuji of plotting treason with the low-level officials Wei Jifang and Li Chao. Zhangsun was exiled and, later in the year, was forced to commit suicide in exile. Xu further implicated Chu, Liu, Han, and Yu Zhining in the plot as well. Chu, who had died in 658, was posthumously stripped of his titles, and his sons Chu Yanfu and Chu Yanchong were executed. Orders were also issued to execute Liu and Han, although Han died before the execution order reached his location. It was said that after this time, no official dared to criticize the emperor or empress.

In order to complete the social promotion of her family, she had the Wu clan listed among those of first importance in the registers of the "Great Families" (姓氏錄, xìngshìlù) by changing the "Book of Clans" to "Books of Names"; against imperial traditions. In late 659, she proposed to Emperor Gaozong that Palace Exam be opened to establish talented people from the lower classes as government officials. This reduced the power of the aristocracy. In 660, Li Zhong, Gaozong's first-born son (to consort Liu) also was targeted. Li Zhong had feared that he would be next and had sought out advice of fortune tellers. Wu had him exiled and placed under house arrest.

Ruling with Emperor Gaozong: (660–683) 
After removing those who opposed her rise, she was more power to influence politics, and Emperor Gaozong took full advantage of her advice on petitions made by officials and talking about state affairs. In 660, Emperor Gaozong and Empress Wu toured Bian Prefecture (modern-day Taiyuan), and Empress Wu had the opportunity to invite her old neighbors and relatives to a feast. Later that year, Emperor Gaozong began to suffer from an illness that carried the symptoms of painful headaches and loss of vision, generally thought to be hypertension-related. He began to have Empress Wu make rulings on daily petitions and proposals made by officials. It was said that Empress Wu had quick reactions and understood both literature and history, and therefore, she made correct rulings, and Emperor Gaozong, with her ability, no longer paid much attention to governmental affairs, and over time and every day more and more depended on her advice, and delegated his duties to her. Thereafter, her authority rivaled Emperor Gaozong's, from this point on, Empress Wu became the undisputed power behind the throne until the end of his reign. Slowly, Gaozong became aware of Wu's increasing power however, he could not stop Wu effectively.

In 661, Empress Wu asked to forbid women from all over the empire to be haiku (referring to entertainers who perform burlesque), and Emperor Gaozong adopted it and issued an edict. In April, Emperor Gaozong wanted to conquer Goguryeo himself, but surrendered at the urging of Empress Wu and his ministers. In 662, at the suggestion of Empress Wu to her husband the titles of the  imperial consorts were temporarily changed to be devoid of feminine and superficial quality. Her motive was probably the possible elimination of female rivals for her power. In the same year, Empress Wu selected military generals to attack Goguryeo. During these years, her ally Li Yifu had been, due to favors from Emperor Gaozong and Empress Wu, exceedingly powerful, and he grew particularly corrupt. In 663, after reports of Li Yifu's corruption were made to Emperor Gaozong, Emperor Gaozong had Liu Xiangdao and Li Ji investigate, finding Li Yifu guilty. Li Yifu was removed from his post and exiled, and would never return to Chang'an. Empress Wu is said to have been reluctant to accept corruption and therefore did not defend Li Yifu and her only role in the decision of Emperor Gaozong was to forgo Li Yifu execution.

During the years, Empress Wu had repeatedly, in her dreams, seen Empress Wang and Consort Xiao, in the states they were after their terrible deaths, and she came to believe that their spirits were after her. For that reason, Emperor Gaozong started remodeling a secondary palace, Daming Palace, into Penglai Palace, and when Penglai Palace's main hall, Hanyuan Hall, was completed in 663, Emperor Gaozong and Empress Wu moved to the newly remodeled palace (which was itself later renamed to Hanyuan Palace). (However, Empress Wang and Consort Xiao continued to appear in her dreams even after this, and therefore, late in Emperor Gaozong's reign, he and Empress Wu were often at the eastern capital Luoyang, not at Chang'an.)

Over the years, Emperor Gaozong's illness had worsened, and Empress Wu's influence continued to grow and was fully established in the political arena. Her controlling behavior and her excessive interference in his decisions, which she did not even dare to make alone, provoked his dissatisfaction. By 664, Empress Wu was said to be interfering so much in governance of the empire that she was angering Emperor Gaozong and was unhappy with her controlling behavior. Furthermore, she had engaged the Taoist sorcerer Guo Xingzhen in using witchcraft—an act that was prohibited by regulations and led to Empress Wang's downfall—and the eunuch Wang Fusheng reported this to Emperor Gaozong which angered him even more. He consulted the chancellor Shangguan Yi, who suggested that he depose Empress Wu. He had Shangguan draft an edict. But as Shangguan was doing so, Empress Wu received news of what was happening. She went to the emperor to plead her case, just as he was holding the edict that Shangguan had drafted. Emperor Gaozong could not bear to depose her and blamed the episode on Shangguan. As both Shangguan and Wang had served on Li Zhong's staff, Empress Wu had Xu falsely accuse Shangguan, Wang, and Li Zhong of planning treason. Shangguan, Wang, and Shangguan's son Shangguan Tingzhi were executed, while Li Zhong was forced to commit suicide. (Shangguan Tingzhi's daughter Shangguan Wan'er, then an infant, and her mother, Lady Zheng, became slaves in the inner palace. After Shangguan Wan'er grew up, she eventually became a trusted secretary for Empress Wu.)

After that point, Gaozong accepted Wu's participation highly more. From January 665 until the end of his reign, Empress Wu would sit behind a pearl screen behind Emperor Gaozong at imperial meetings and she called her own orders "emperor edicts."; She even wore the yellow robe of the empire like an emperor, which was extraordinary and unprecedented for an empress, and Wu was effectively making the major and key decisions. After the execution of Shangguan Yi, Gaozong increasingly relied on Wu's advice and ruled on her words. Whenever the chancellors and officials discussed political affairs with him, the first sentence he asked was: "Have you ever discussed with Empress Wu? what is her opinion?" If she have clear opinions, he will make a decision based on this, and even whenever he was unpleasant, he would tell the  chancellors and officials, "I'm not feeling well. Go to the Empress for work." As a result, imperial powers primarily fell into her hands.  According to Song dynasty historian Sīmǎ Guāng 司马光 in the Zizhi Tongjian: "Emperor Gaozong sat enthroned before his ministers as usual while they counseled him, Wu would be parked behind a screen, listening in. It does not matter how vital or insignificant the issue is. The great power of the empire all devolved on the empress. Promotion or demotion, life or death, were settled by her word, The emperor sat with folded arms." She and Emperor Gaozong were thereafter referred to as the "Two Saints" (Er Sheng) both inside the palace and in the empire. The Later Jin historian Liu Xu, in Old Book of Tang, commented:

In 665, Emperor Gaozong and Empress Wu went to Luoyang and began preparation in earnest to make sacrifices to heaven and earth at Mount Tai – a traditional ceremony for emperors that were rarely carried out in history due to the large expenses associated with them. At Empress Wu's request—as she reasoned that the sacrifice to earth also included sacrifices to past empresses (Emperor Gaozong's mother Empress Zhangsun and grandmother Duchess Dou, posthumously honored as an empress), she believed that it would be more appropriate to have females offer the sacrifices rather than male officials, as had been tradition in the past. Emperor Gaozong decreed that the male ministers would offer sacrifices first, but Empress Wu would next offer sacrifices, followed by Princess Dowager Yan, the mother of Emperor Gaozong's younger brother Li Zhen the Prince of Yue. In winter 665, Emperor Gaozong and Empress Wu and headed for Mount Tai. On the lunar new year (10 February 666), he and she initiated the sacrifices to heaven, which were not completed until the next day. On 12 February, sacrifices were made to earth. He and she gave general promotions to the imperial officials, and it was said that starting from this time, promotions of imperial officials, which were strict and slow during the reigns of Emperors Gaozu and Taizong, began to become more relaxed and often excessive. He and Empress Wu also declared a general pardon, except for long-term exiles.

Meanwhile, on account of Empress Wu's almost absolute authority, her mother Lady Yang had been made the Lady of Rong, and her older sister, now widowed, the Lady of Han, and Lady of Rong and Lady of Han wealth surpassed that of all the Chang'an noble families, and they settled in the imperial palace. Her half-brothers Wu Yuanqing and Wu Yuanshuang and cousins Wu Weiliang and Wu Huaiyun, despite the poor relationships that they had with Lady Yang, were promoted and they became extremely rich. But at a feast that Lady Yang held for them, Wu Weiliang offended Lady Yang by stating that they did not find it honorable for them to be promoted on account of Empress Wu. Empress Wu, therefore, ordered to have them demoted to remote prefectures—outwardly to show modesty, but in reality to avenge the offense to her mother. Wu Yuanqing and Wu Yuanshuang died in effective exile. Meanwhile, in or before 666, Lady of Han died as well. Historians attribute Lady of Han death to poisoning at the behest of Empress Wu, as she and the emperor became involved in adultery. After Lady of Han's death, Emperor Gaozong made her daughter the Lady of Wei and considered keeping her in the palace—possibly as a concubine. He did not immediately do so, as he feared that Empress Wu would be displeased. It was said that Empress Wu heard of this and was nevertheless displeased. She had her niece poisoned, by placing poison in food offerings that Wu Weiliang and Wu Huaiyun had made and then blaming them for the death of the Lady of Wei. At Empress Wu command, Wu Weiliang and Wu Huaiyun were executed.

Over the years, Empress Wu had also targeted the children of Emperor Gaozong with his concubines. One of these children was Sujie, the son of Consort Xiao, whom Wu had killed in 655. Early in Gaozong's Qianfeng era (666-668), at Wu's instigation, Gaozong issued an edict that read, "Because Sujie is chronically ill, he is not required to attend imperial gatherings at the capital". In reality, Li Sujie was not ill, and the edict effectively barred him from the capitals Chang'an and Luoyang. Saddened that he was not allowed to see his father, Li Sujie wrote an essay titled "Commentary on Faithfulness and Filial Piety" (忠孝論), which was already lost by the Five Dynasties period. His cashier Zhang Jianzhi secretly submitted the essay to Gaozong. Wu read it, it drew her ire, and she falsely accused Li Sujie of corruption. In 670, Wu's mother, Lady Yang, died, and by Gaozong's and Wu's orders, all of the imperial officials and their wives attended her wake and mourned her. Later that year, with the realm suffering from a major drought, Wu offered to be deposed, which Gaozong rejected. At her request, he further posthumously honored Wu Shiyue (who had previously been posthumously honored as the Duke of Zhou) and Lady Yang by giving them the titles of the Prince and Princess of Taiyuan.

Meanwhile, the son of Empress Wu's older sister the Lady of Han, Helan Minzhi, had been given the surname Wu and allowed to inherit the title of Duke of Zhou. But as it was becoming clear to Empress Wu that he suspected her of murdering his sister, the Lady of Wei, Wu began to take precautions against him. (Helan was also said to have had an incestuous relationship with his grandmother Lady Yang.) In 671, Helan was accused of disobeying mourning regulations during the period of mourning for Lady Yang and raping the daughter of the official Yang Sijian, whom Gaozong and Wu had previously selected to be the wife and crown princess for Li Hong. On Wu's orders, Helan was exiled and either was executed in exile or committed suicide. In 673, Wu provided 20,000 cash for a gigantic statue of Maitreya at Longmen Grottoes. In 674, she had Wu Yuanshuang's son Wu Chengsi recalled from exile to inherit the title of Duke of Zhou.

Although she had real power, Empress Wu was still in the background, and unsatisfied with her position, so took steps to increase the credibility of her power. In 674, one of her claims concerned the title of empress; she argued that because the emperor was called Son of Heaven (天子, Tiānzǐ), his wife should be called Heaven Empress (天后, Tiānhòu). As a result, she linked her rule with divine right. In 675, she succeeded in making her rule popular with the people with "twelve decrees" or "twelve proposals" for better governance and welfare of the people. In middle 675, as Emperor Gaozong's illness worsened, he considered having Wu formally rule as regent. The chancellor Hao Chujun and the official Li Yiyan both opposed this because Wu was already more powerful than Gaozong and they feared that she might take full possession of the throne. As a result, Gaozong did not formally make her regent, and Wu co-ruled with him as divine monarchs until his death in 683. After Hao Chujun opposed her appointment as regent, Wu reduced chancellors' power in state affairs by appointing several scientists as her advisers. She also wanted to diminish the importance of the army, in order to keep it only as a means of "moral education" for the people.

Also in 675, a number of people fell victim to Empress Wu's ire. She had been displeased at the favor that Emperor Gaozong had shown his aunt, Princess Changle. Changle was married to General Zhao Gui and had a daughter who became the wife and princess consort of Wu's third son, Li Xiǎn, the Prince of Zhou. Princess Zhao was accused of unspecified crimes and placed under arrest, eventually starving to death. Zhao Gui and Changle were exiled. Meanwhile, later that month, Li Hong, the Crown Prince—who urged Wu not to exercise so much influence and authority on Gaozong's governance and offended her by requesting that his half-sisters, Consort Xiao's daughters, Princess Yiyang and Xuancheng (under house arrest) be allowed to marry—died suddenly. Traditional historians generally believed that Wu poisoned Li Hong to death. At her request, Li Xián, then carrying the title of Prince of Yong, was created crown prince. Meanwhile, Consort Xiao's son Li Sujie and another son of Gaozong's, Li Shangjin, were repeatedly accused of crimes by Wu and were subsequently demoted.

Soon, Empress Wu's relationship with Li Xián also deteriorated because he had become unsettled after hearing rumors that he was not born to her but to her sister, the Lady of Han. When Wu heard of his fearfulness, she became angry with him. She had her literary staff write two works, Good Examples for Shaoyang (少陽正範, "Shaoyang" being an oblique term for a crown prince) and Biographies of Filial Sons (孝子傳) and gave them to Li Xian, and further wrote a number of letters rebuking him, making him more fearful. In 678, contemporary poet Luo Binwang 骆宾王 criticized Wu's involvement in governmental affairs: "She whispered slander from behind her sleeves, and swayed emperor with vixen flirting." Luo's remarks angered Wu and he was dismissed and imprisoned. Furthermore, the sorcerer Ming Chongyan, whom both Wu and Gaozong respected, had said that Li Xián was unsuitable to inherit the throne and was assassinated in 679. The assassins were not caught, making Wu suspect that Li Xián was behind the assassination. Li Xian was also known for his liking of music and women. (Some historians, pointing to oblique references that he was "particularly close" to a number of male servants, also believe that he liked sexual relations with both women and men.) When Wu heard this, she had people report the news to Gaozong. In 680, Li Xián was accused of crimes and during an investigation by the officials Xue Yuanchao, Pei Yan, and Gao Zhizhou, a large number of weaponry was found in his palace. Wu formally accused him of treason and the assassination of Ming. Gaozong wanted to forgive Li Xián for treason, but Wu refused, saying, "Heaven and the world cannot stand the conspiracy against the Son of Heaven. How can he be forgiven? if you do not treat your loved ones with justice, how can you maintain order?" He surrendered at her insistence. Li Xián was deposed and exiled, and at Wu's request, placed under house arrest.

At Empress Wu's request, after the exile of Li Xián, his younger brother Li Xiǎn [similar-sounding name but different Chinese characters] (now renamed Li Zhe) was named crown prince.

In 681, Princess Taiping was married to Xue Shao, the son of Emperor Gaozong's sister Princess Chengyang, in a grand ceremony. Empress Wu, initially unimpressed with the lineages of Xue Shao's brothers' wives, wanted to order his brothers to divorce their wives—stopping only after it was pointed out to her that Lady Xiao, the wife of Xue Shao's older brother Xue Yi, was a grandniece of the deceased chancellor Xiao Yu. The official Feng Yuanchang was appointed by Gaozong, and he trusted him very much. In 682, Feng also lamented Empress Wu's power and involvement in the administration of the empire and told the emperor: "The queen's authority is very strong, should it be reduced?" Gaozong opposed it, and he was afraid of her, and there was nothing he could do. Upon learning of Feng's ineffective advice to the emperor, Wu became very angry with Feng, and accused him of corruption and degraded him. In 682, Wu pretended to be so friendly that she recalled Shangjin and Sujie and submitted a petition for them to be forgiven their crimes. (Li Shangjin had been previously accused of similar offenses as Li Sujie's and was similarly put under house arrest.) Gaozong made Li Sujie the prefect of Yue Prefecture (岳州, roughly modern Yueyang, Hunan), but she still forbade him and Li Shangjin to visit the capital, and would never allow them to attend political affairs.

In late 683, Gaozong died at Luoyang. At the time of his death, no one was allowed to visit him, and Empress Wu forbade anyone from seeing him, from their children to officials, which led to rumors that she had killed him. Before his death, at Wu's request, he ordered Li Zhe to come to Luoyang, and at her suggestion, handed over the imperial power to Li Zhe. Under her protection, Li Zhe took the throne (as Emperor Zhongzong), but Wu retained the real authority as empress dowager and regent.

Empress dowager

Plenipotentiary regent for Emperor Zhongzong 
Upon the death of her husband Emperor Gaozong, Wu became empress dowager (húangtàihòu) and then regent and she automatically gained full power over the empire, through the will of the Gaozong's, complete with a piece of advice in the will that basically amounted to the governing equivalent of "listen to mommy". As a result, Empress Wu should claim the senior authority in the empire for herself. Wu had already poisoned the crown prince Li Hong and had enough other princes exiled that her third son, Li Zhe, was made heir apparent. Furthermore, Gaozong's will included provisions that Li Zhe should ascend immediately to the imperial throne, Empress Wu must continue to influence all governmental and border matters, and as he had done, the new emperor should look to Empress Wu in regards to any important matter, either military or civil, either rewards or penalties, and he has to get her approval. Therefore, she did not in any way allow the new emperor to decide, and she was the sole decision-maker. In the second month of 684, Li Zhe ascended to the imperial throne, known as his temple name Zhongzong, for a short six weeks.

The new emperor was married to a woman of the Wei family. Because Zhongzong was as weak and incompetent as his father, the new empress sought to place herself in the same position of great authority that Empress Wu had enjoyed. Empress Wei had seen that, Empress Wu had a tight grip on power and favors from Emperor Gaozong throughout the years and Wei wanted to be an uncontrollable and powerful empress consort like Wu.

Immediately, Emperor Zhongzong showed signs of disobeying Empress Dowager Wu. Emperor Zhongzong was under the thumb of his wife, Empress Wei. Under her influence, the Emperor, appointed his father-in-law as prime minister. He also tried to make his father-in-law Shizhong (the head of the examination bureau of government, Menxia Sheng, and a post considered one for a chancellor) and gave a mid-level office to his wet nurse's son—despite stern opposition by the chancellor Pei Yan, at one point remarking to Pei:

Pei reported this to Empress Dowager Wu, and she, after planning with Pei, Liu Yizhi, and the generals Cheng Wuting and Zhang Qianxu deposed Emperor Zhongzong and replaced him with her youngest son Li Dan, the Prince of Yu (as Emperor Ruizong). Empress Dowager Wu had Zhongzong's father-in-law, Wei Xuanzhen, brought up on charges of treason. Wei Xuanzhen was sent into seclusion. Emperor Zhongzong was reduced to the title of Prince of Luling and exiled. Empress Dowager Wu also sent the general, Qiu Shenji to Li Xián's place in exile and forced Li Xián to commit suicide. As a result, Empress Dowager Wu used absolute power more strongly, centrally and violent than ever before.

Plenipotentiary regent for Emperor Ruizong 
Wu had her youngest son Li Dan made emperor, known as his temple name Ruizong. She was the absolute ruler, however, both in substance and appearance. Wu did not even follow the customary pretense of hiding behind a screen or curtain and, in whispers, issued commands for the nominal ruler to formally announce, and so her reign was fully recognized. Ruizong never moved into the imperial quarters, appeared at no imperial function, and remained a virtual prisoner in the inner quarters. Although Emperor Ruizong held the title of emperor, Empress Dowager Wu firmly and exactly controlled the imperial court, and the officials were not allowed to meet with Emperor Ruizong, nor was he allowed to rule on matters of state, and she, not Emperor Ruizong, was the one that officials reported to, with Emperor Ruizong not even nominally approving official actions. Thus, all matters of empire were ruled on by Empress Dowager Wu. Soon after Emperor Ruizong took the throne, Empress Dowager Wu carried out a major renaming of governmental offices and banners. She, who disliked the capital Chang'an, also elevated Luoyang's status, making it a co-equal capital with Chang'an. At the suggestion of her nephew Wu Chengsi, she also expanded the ancestral shrine of the Wu ancestors and gave them greater posthumous honors, and made Wu's ancestral shrine the size of the emperors ancestral shrine.

Soon thereafter, Li Ji's grandson Li Jingye, the Duke of Ying, who had been disaffected by his own exile, started a rebellion at Yang Prefecture (roughly modern Yangzhou, Jiangsu). The rebellion initially drew much popular support in the region, however, Li Jingye progressed slowly in his attack and did not take advantage of that popular support. Meanwhile, Pei suggested to Empress Dowager Wu that she return imperial authority to the Emperor and argued that doing so would cause the rebellion to collapse on its own. This offended her, and she accused him of being complicit with Li Jingye and had him executed; she also demoted, exiled, and killed a number of officials who, when Pei was arrested, tried to speak on his behalf. She sent a general, Li Xiaoyi, to attack Li Jingye, and while Li Xiaoyi was initially unsuccessful, he pushed on at the urging of his assistant Wei Yuanzhong and eventually was able to crush Li Jingye's forces. Li Jingye fled and was killed in flight.

By 685, Empress Dowager Wu began to carry on an affair with the Buddhist monk Huaiyi and during the next few years, Huaiyi would be bestowed with progressively greater honors. In 686, Empress Dowager Wu offered to return imperial authorities to Emperor Ruizong, but Emperor Ruizong, knowing that she did not truly intend to do so, declined, and she continued to exercise imperial authority. Meanwhile, she installed copper mailboxes outside the imperial government buildings to encourage the people of the realm to report secretly on others, as she suspected many officials of opposing her, and also all the reports of betrayal were read by her personally. Thus, exploiting these beliefs of hers, secret police officials, including Suo Yuanli, Zhou Xing, and Lai Junchen, began to rise in power and to carry out systematic false accusations, tortures, and executions of individuals.

In 688, Empress Dowager Wu was set to make sacrifices to the deity of the Luo River (flowing through the Henan province city of Luoyang, then the "Eastern Capital"). Wu summoned senior members of Tang's Li imperial clan to Luoyang. The imperial princes worried that she planned to slaughter them and secure the throne for herself: thus, they plotted to resist her. Before a rebellion could be comprehensively planned out, however, Li Zhen and his son Li Chong, the Prince of Langye rose first, at their respective posts as prefects of Yu Prefecture (roughly modern Zhumadian, Henan) and Bo Prefecture (roughly modern Liaocheng, Shandong). The other princes were not yet ready, however, and did not rise, and forces sent by Empress Dowager Wu and the local forces crushed Li Chong and Li Zhen's forces quickly. Empress Dowager Wu took this opportunity to arrest Emperor Gaozong's granduncles Li Yuanjia the Prince of Han, Li Lingkui the Prince of Lu, and Princess Changle, as well as many other members of the Li clan and she, forced them to commit suicide. Even Princess Taiping's husband Xue Shao was implicated and starved to death. In the subsequent years, there continued to be many politically motivated massacres of officials and Li clan members.

In 690, Wu took the final step to become the empress regnant of the newly proclaimed Zhou dynasty, and the title Huangdi. Traditional Chinese order of succession (akin to the Salic law in Europe) did not allow a woman to ascend the throne, but Wu Zetian was determined to quash the opposition and the use of the secret police did not subside, but continued, after her taking the throne. While her organization of the civil service system was criticized for its laxity of the promotion of officials, nonetheless, Wu Zetian was considered capable of evaluating the performance of the officials once they were in office. The Song dynasty historian Sima Guang, in his Zizhi Tongjian, commented:

Reign as empress regnant
In 690, Wu had Emperor Ruizong yield the throne to her and established the Zhou dynasty, with herself as the imperial ruler (Huangdi).

The early part of her reign was characterized by secret police terror, which moderated as the years went by. She was, on the other hand, recognized as a capable and attentive ruler even by traditional historians who despised her, and her ability to select capable men to serve as officials was admired for the rest of the Tang dynasty as well as in subsequent dynasties.

Early reign (690–696) 

Shortly after Wu took the throne in her newly established dynasty, she elevated the status of Buddhism above that of Taoism, officially sanctioning Buddhism by building temples named Dayun Temple in each prefecture belonging to the capital regions of the two capitals Luoyang and Chang'an, and created nine senior monks as dukes. She also enshrined seven generations of Wu ancestors at the imperial ancestral temple, although she also continued to offer sacrifices to the Tang emperors Gaozu, Taizong, and Gaozong.

Wu faced the issue of succession. At the time she took the throne, she created Li Dan, the former Emperor Ruizong, crown prince, and bestowed the name Wu on him. But the official Zhang Jiafu convinced the commoner Wang Qingzhi to start a petition drive to make her nephew Wu Chengsi crown prince, arguing that an emperor named Wu should pass the throne to a member of the Wu clan. Wu Zetian was tempted to do so, and when the chancellors Cen Changqian and Ge Fuyuan opposed sternly, they, along with fellow chancellor Ouyang Tong, were executed. Nevertheless, she declined Wang's request to make Wu Chengsi crown prince, but for a time allowed Wang to freely enter the palace to see her. On one occasion, however, when Wang angered her by coming to the palace too much, she asked the official Li Zhaode to batter Wang as punishment—but Li Zhaode exploited the opportunity to batter Wang to death, and his group of petitioners scattered. Li Zhaode then persuaded Wu Zetian to keep Li Dan as crown prince—pointing out that a son was closer in relations than a nephew, and also that if Wu Chengsi became emperor, Gaozong would never again be worshiped. Wu Zetian agreed, and for some time did not reconsider the matter. Further, at Li Zhaode's warning that Wu Chengsi was becoming too powerful, Wu Zetian stripped Wu Chengsi of his chancellor authority and bestowed on him largely honorific titles without authority.

Meanwhile, the secret police officials' power continued to increase, until they appeared to be curbed starting in about 692, when Lai Junchen was foiled in his attempt to have the chancellors Ren Zhigu, Di Renjie, Pei Xingben, and other officials Cui Xuanli, Lu Xian, Wei Yuanzhong, and Li Sizhen executed, as Di, under arrest, had hidden a secret petition inside a change of clothes and had it submitted by his son Di Guangyuan. The seven were exiled, but after this incident, particularly at the urging of Li Zhaode, Zhu Jingze, and Zhou Ju, the waves of politically motivated massacres decreased, although they did not end entirely. Wu Zetian utilized the imperial examination system to find talented poor people or people without backgrounds to stabilize her regime.

Also in 692, Wu Zetian commissioned the general Wang Xiaojie to attack the Tibetan Empire, and Wang recaptured the four garrisons of the Western Regions that had fallen to the Tibetan Empire in 670 – Kucha, Yutian, Kashgar, and Suyab.

In 693, after Wu's trusted lady-in-waiting Wei Tuan'er, who hated Li Dan because he rejected her advances, falsely accused Li Dan's wife Crown Princess Liu and Consort Dou of using witchcraft, Wu had Crown Princess Liu and Consort Dou killed. Li Dan, fearful that he was to be next, did not dare speak of them. When Wei further planned to falsely accuse Li Dan, someone informed on her, and she was executed. Wu nevertheless had Li Dan's sons demoted in their princely titles, and when the officials Pei Feigong and Fan Yunxian were accused of secretly meeting Li Dan, she executed Pei and Fan and further barred officials from meeting Li Dan. There were then accusations that Li Dan was plotting treason, and under Wu's direction, Lai launched an investigation. He arrested Li Dan's servants and tortured them—and the torture was such that many of them were ready to falsely implicate themselves and Li Dan. But one of Li Dan's servants, An Jincang, proclaimed Li Dan's innocence and cut his own belly open to swear to that fact. When Wu heard what An did, she had doctors attend to An and barely save his life, and then ordered Lai to end the investigation, thus saving Li Dan.

In 694, Li Zhaode, who had become powerful after Wu Chengsi's removal, was thought to be too powerful, and Wu Zetian removed him. Also around this time, she became highly impressed with a group of mystic individuals—the hermit Wei Shifang (on whom she bestowed a chancellor title briefly), who claimed to be more than 350 years old; an old Buddhist nun who claimed to be a Buddha and capable of predicting the future; and a non-Han man who claimed to be 500 years old. During this time, Wu briefly claimed to be and adopted the cult imagery of Maitreya in order to build popular support for her reign.

In 695, after the imperial meeting hall and the Heavenly Hall were burned by Huaiyi (who was jealous at Wu's taking another lover, the imperial physician Shen Nanqiu, Wu became angry at these mystics for failing to predict the fire; the old nun and her students were arrested and made into slaves; Wei committed suicide; and the old non-Han man fled. Wu also put Huaiyi to death. After this incident, she appeared to pay less attention to mysticism and became even more dedicated than before to the affairs of state.

Middle reign (696–701) 

Wu's administration soon faced various troubles on the western and northern borders. In spring 696, an army she sent, commanded by Wang Xiaojie and Lou Shide against the Tibetan Empire, was soundly defeated by Tibetan generals, the brothers Gar Trinring Tsendro and Gar Tsenba, and as a result, she demoted Wang to commoner rank and Lou to a low-level prefectural official, though she eventually restored both to general positions. In April of the same year, Wu recast the Nine Tripod Cauldrons, the symbol of ultimate power in ancient China, to reinforce her authority.

A much more serious threat arose in summer 696. The Khitan chieftains Li Jinzhong and Sun Wanrong, brothers-in-law, angry over the mistreatment of the Khitan people by the Zhou official Zhao Wenhui, the prefect of Ying Prefecture (roughly Zhaoyang County, Liaoning), rebelled, with Li assuming the title of Wushang Khan. Armies that Wu sent to suppress Li and Sun's rebellion were defeated by Khitan forces, which in turn attacked Zhou proper. Meanwhile, Qapaghan Qaghan of the Second Turkic Khaganate offered to submit, while also launching attacks against Zhou and Khitan. The attacks included one against the Khitan base of operations during the winter of 696, shortly after Li's death, which resulted in capturing Li's and Sun's families and temporarily halted Khitan operations against Zhou. Sun, after taking over as khan and reorganizing Khitan forces, again attacked Zhou territory and had many victories over Zhou forces, including a battle during which Wang Shijie was killed. Wu tried to allay the situation by making peace with Ashina Mochuo on fairly costly terms—the return of Tujue people who had previously submitted to Zhou and providing Mochuo with seeds, silk, tools, and iron. In summer 697, Mochuo launched another attack on Khitan's base of operations, and this time, after his attack, Khitan forces collapsed and Sun was killed in flight, ending the Khitan threat.

Meanwhile, also in 697, Lai Junchen, who had at one point lost power but then returned to power, falsely accused Li Zhaode (who had been pardoned) of crimes, and then planned to falsely accuse Li Dan, Li Zhe, the Wu clan princes, and Princess Taiping of treason. The Wu clan princes and Princess Taiping acted first against him, accusing him of crimes, and he and Li Zhaode were executed together. After Lai's death, the secret police's reign largely ended. Gradually, many of the victims of Lai and the other secret police officials were exonerated posthumously. Meanwhile, around this time, Wu began relationships with two new lovers—the brothers Zhang Yizhi and Zhang Changzong, who became honored within the palace and were eventually created dukes.

Around 698, Wu Chengsi and another nephew of Wu Zetian's, Wu Sansi, the Prince of Liang, repeatedly made attempts to have officials persuade Wu Zetian to create one of them crown prince—again arguing that an emperor should pass the throne to someone of the same clan. But Di Renjie, who by now had become a trusted chancellor, firmly opposed the idea, and proposed that Li Zhe be recalled instead. He was supported in this by fellow chancellors Wang Fangqing and Wang Jishan, as well as Wu Zetian's close advisor Ji Xu, who further persuaded the Zhang brothers to support the idea. In spring 698, Wu agreed and recalled Li Zhe from exile. Soon, Li Dan offered to yield the crown prince position to Li Zhe, and Wu created Li Zhe crown prince. She soon changed his name back to Li Xiǎn and then Wu Xian.

Later, Ashina Mochuo demanded a Tang dynasty prince for marriage to his daughter, part of a plot to join his family with the Tang, displace the Zhou, and restore Tang rule over China (under his influence). When Wu sent a member of her own family, grandnephew Wu Yanxiu, to marry Mochuo's daughter instead, he rejected him. Mochuo had no intention to cement the peace treaty with a marriage; instead, when Wu Yanxiu arrived, he detained him and then launched a major attack on Zhou, advancing as far south as Zhao Prefecture (in modern Shijiazhuang, Hebei) before withdrawing.

In 699, the Tibetan threat ceased. Emperor Tridu Songtsen, unhappy that Gar Trinring was monopolizing power, slaughtered Trinring's associates when Trinring was away from Lhasa. He then defeated Trinring in battle, and Trinring committed suicide. Gar Tsenba and Trinring's son, Lun Gongren, surrendered to Zhou. After this, the Tibetan Empire was under internal turmoil for several years, and there was peace for Zhou on the border.

Also in 699, Wu, realizing that she was growing old, feared that after her death, Li Xian and the Wu clan princes would not have peace with each other, and she made him, Li Dan, Princess Taiping, Princess Taiping's second husband Wu Youji (a nephew of hers), the Prince of Ding, and other Wu clan princes to swear an oath to each other.

Late reign (701–705) 

As Wu grew older, Zhang Yizhi and Zhang Changzong became increasingly powerful, and even the princes of the Wu clan flattered them. She also increasingly relied on them to handle the affairs of state. This was secretly discussed and criticized by her grandson Li Chongrun, the Prince of Shao (Li Xian's son), granddaughter Li Xianhui the Lady Yongtai (Li Chongrun's sister), and Li Xianhui's husband Wu Yanji the Prince of Wei (Wu Zetian's grandnephew and Wu Chengsi's son), but somehow the discussion was leaked, and Zhang Yizhi reported this to Wu. She ordered the three of them to commit suicide. 

Despite her age, Wu continued to be interested in finding talented officials and promoting them. People she promoted in her old age included Cui Xuanwei and Zhang Jiazhen.

By 703, Zhang Yizhi and Zhang Changzong had become resentful of Wei Yuanzhong, who by now was a senior chancellor, for dressing down their brother Zhang Changyi and rejecting the promotion of another brother, Zhang Changqi. They also were fearful that if Wu died, Wei would find a way to execute them, and therefore accused Wei and Gao Jian, an official favored by Princess Taiping, of speculating on Wu's old age and death. They initially got Wei's subordinate Zhang Shuo to agree to corroborate the charges, but once Zhang Shuo was before Wu, he instead accused Zhang Yizhi and Zhang Changzong of forcing him to bear false witness. As a result, Wei, Gao, and Zhang Shuo were exiled, but escaped death.

Removal and death 

In autumn 704, accusations of corruption began to be levied against Zhang Yizhi and Zhang Changzong, as well as their brothers Zhang Changqi, Zhang Changyi, and Zhang Tongxiu. Zhang Tongxiu and Zhang Changyi were demoted, but even though the officials Li Chengjia and Huan Yanfan advocated that Zhang Yizhi and Zhang Changzong be removed as well, Wu Zetian, taking the suggestion of the chancellor Yang Zaisi, did not do so. Subsequently, charges of corruption against Zhang Yizhi and Zhang Changzong were renewed by the chancellor Wei Anshi.

In winter 704, Wu Zetian became seriously ill for a period, and only the Zhang brothers were allowed to see her; the chancellors were not. This led to speculation that Zhang Yizhi and Zhang Changzong were plotting to take over the throne, and there were repeated accusations of treason. Once her condition improved, Cui Xuanwei advocated that only Li Xian and Li Dan be allowed to attend to her—a suggestion she did not accept. After further accusations against the Zhang brothers by Huan and Song Jing, Wu allowed Song to investigate, but before the investigation was completed, she issued a pardon for Zhang Yizhi, derailing Song's investigation.

By spring 705, Wu was seriously ill again. Zhang Jianzhi, Jing Hui, and Yuan Shuji planned a coup to kill the Zhang brothers. They convinced the generals Li Duozuo, Li Dan (note different character than the former emperor), and Yang Yuanyan and another chancellor, Yao Yuanzhi, to be involved. With agreement from Li Xian as well, they acted on 20 February, killing Zhang Yizhi and Zhang Changzong, and had Changsheng Hall, where Wu was residing, surrounded. They then reported to her that the Zhang brothers had been executed for treason, and forced her to yield the throne to Li Xian. On 21 February, an edict was issued in her name that made Li Xian regent, and on 22 February, an edict was issued in her name passing the throne to him. On 23 February, Li Xian formally retook the throne, and the next day, under heavy guard, Wu was moved to the subsidiary palace, Shangyang Palace, while still honored with the title of Empress Regent Zetian Dasheng. On 3 March, the Tang dynasty was restored, ending the Zhou.

Wu died on 16 December, and, pursuant to a final edict issued in her name, was no longer called empress regnant, but instead "Empress Consort Zetian Dasheng". In 706, Wu's son Emperor Zhongzong had Wu interred in a joint burial with his father, Emperor Gaozong, at the Qianling Mausoleum, near the capital Chang'an on Mount Liang. Zhongzong also buried at Qianling his brother Li Xián, son Li Chongrun, and daughter Li Xianhui the Lady Yongtai (posthumously honored as the Princess Yongtai)—victims of Wu's wrath.

Wu Zhou dynasty 

In 690, Wu Zetian founded the Wu Zhou dynasty, named after the historical Zhou dynasty (1046–256 BC). The traditional historical view is to discount the Wu Zhou dynasty: dynasties by definition involve the succession of rulers from one family, and the Wu Zhou dynasty was founded by Wu and ended within her lifetime, with her abdication in 705. The alternative is to view the Wu Zhou dynasty as the revival of the historical Zhou dynasty, which was ruled (at least nominally) by the Ji family, almost a thousand years before. Either way, the Wu Zhou dynasty was a brief interruption of the Li family's Tang dynasty, not a fully realized dynasty. But Wu's claim to found a new dynasty was little opposed at the time (690). The 15-year period that Wu designated as her "Zhou Dynasty", considered in the context of nearly a half century of de facto and de jure rule (c. 654–705), reveals a remarkable and still debated period of history. In this context, designating a new dynasty with her as emperor can be seen as part of her power politics and as the culmination of her rule. Though Wu's Zhou dynasty had its own notable characteristics, they are difficult to separate from Wu's reign of power, which lasted for about half of a century.

Wu's consolidation of power in part relied on a system of spies. She used informants to choose people to eliminate, a process that peaked in 697 with the wholesale demotion, exile, or killing of various aristocratic families and scholars, furthermore prohibiting their sons from holding office.

Wu eliminated many of her real, potential, or perceived rivals to power by means of death (including execution, suicide by command, and more or less directly killing people), demotion, and exile. Mostly this was carried out by her secret police, led by people like Wao Ganjun and Lai Junchen, who were known to have written the Manual of Accusation, a document detailing steps for interrogation and obtaining confessions by torture. One of these methods, the "Dying Swine's Melancholy", which merely indicated a level of pain inflicted by a torture device, seems to have been conflated in the years following Wu's death with the story of the "human swine" torture conducted by Empress Lü Zhi, in which the victim had limbs and tongue amputated, was force-fed, and left to wallow in his own excrement.

Wu targeted various people, including many in her own family. In reaction to an attempt to remove her from power, in 684, she massacred 12 entire collateral branches of the imperial family. Besides this, she also altered the ancient balance of power in China dating to the Qin dynasty. The old area of the Qin state was later called Guanzhong—literally, the area "within the fortified mountain passes". From this area of northwest China, the Ying family of Qin arose, unifying China into its first historical empire. During the Han dynasty, Sima Qian records in his Shiji that Guanzhong had three-tenths of China's population but six-tenths of its wealth. Additionally, at the beginning of Wu's ascendency, Guanzhong was still the stronghold of the most nationally powerful aristocratic families, even though economic development in other parts of China had improved the lot of families in other regions. The Guangzhong aristocracy was not willing to relinquish its hold on the reins of government, but some of the more newly wealthy families in other areas, such as the North China Plain or Hubei, were eager for a larger share of national power. Most of the opposition to Wu was from the Guangzhong families of northwest China. Accordingly, she repressed them, instead favoring less privileged families, thus raising to the ranks of power many talented but less aristocratic families, often recruited through the official examination system. Many of those so favored originated from the North China plain. Through a process of eliminating or diminishing the power of the established aristocracy, whom she perceived as disloyal to her, and establishing a reformed upper class in China loyal to her, Wu made major social changes that historians are still evaluating.

Many of Wu's measures were popular and helped her to gain support for her rule. Wu came to power during a time in China in which the people were fairly contented, the administration was run well, and the economy was characterized by rising living standards. For the most part, as far as the masses were concerned, Wu continued in this manner. She was determined that free, self-sufficient farmers continue to work their own land, so she periodically used the juntian, equal-field system, together with updated census figures to ensure fair land allocations, reallocating as necessary. Much of her success was due to her various edicts (including those known as her "Acts of Grace"), which helped satisfy the needs of the lower classes through various acts of relief, her widening recruitment to government service to include previously excluded gentry and commoners, and her generous promotions and pay raises for the lower ranks.

Wu used her military and diplomatic skills to enhance her position. The fubing system of self-supportive soldier-farmer colonies, which provided local militia and labor services for her government, allowed her to maintain her armed forces at reduced expense. She also pursued a policy of military action to expand the empire to its furthest extent ever up to that point in Central Asia. Expansion efforts against Tibet and to the northwest were less successful. Allying with the Korean kingdom of Silla against Goguryeo with the promise of ceding Goguryeo's territory to Silla, Chinese forces occupied Goguryeo after its defeat, and even began to occupy Silla territory. Silla resisted the imposition of Chinese rule, and by allying with Goguryeo and Baekche, was able to expel its former ally from the peninsula. Hong argues that Silla's success was in part due to a shift in Wu's focus to Tibet and inadequate support for the forces in the Korean peninsula. In 694, Wu's forces decisively defeated the Tibetan–Western Turk alliance and retook the Four Garrisons of Anxi, lost in 668.

In 651, shortly after the Muslim conquest of Persia, the first Arab ambassador arrived in China.

Reform of the imperial examination system
One apparatus of government that fell into Wu's power was the imperial examination system, the basic theory and practice of which was to recruit into government service those men who were the best educated, most talented, and had the best potential to perform their duties, and to do so by testing a pool of candidates to determine this. This pool was male only, and the qualified pool of candidates and resulting placements into official positions was on a relatively small scale at the time Wu took control of government. The official tests examined things considered important for functionaries of the highly developed, bureaucratic government structure of the imperial government, such as level of literacy in terms of reading and writing and possession of the specific knowledge considered necessary and desirable for a governmental official, such as Confucian precepts on the nature of virtue and theory on the proper ordering of and relationships within society. Wu continued to use the imperial examination system to recruit civil servants, and introduced major changes to the system she inherited, including increasing the pool of candidates permitted to take the test by allowing commoners and gentry, previously disqualified by their background, to take it. In 693, she expanded the governmental examination system and greatly increased the importance of this method of recruiting government officials. Wu provided increased opportunity for the representation within government to people of the North China Plain versus people of the northwestern aristocratic families (whom she decimated, anyway); and the successful candidates recruited through the examination system became an elite group within her government. The historical details of the consequences of Wu's promoting a new group of people from previously disenfranchised backgrounds into prominence as powerful governmental officials, and the examination system's role, remain debated by scholars of this subject.

Religion

The Great Cloud Sutra 
Wu Zetian used her political powers to harness from Buddhist practices a strategy to build sovereignty and legitimacy to her throne while decisively establishing the Zhou dynasty in a society under Confucian and patriarchal ideals. One of the first steps she took to legitimize her ascension to the throne was to proclaim herself as the reincarnation of the Devi of Pure Radiance (Jingguang tiannü) through a series of prophecies. In 690, Wu sought out the support of the monk Xue Huaiyi, her reputed lover, and other nine orthodox Buddhist monks, to compose the apocryphal Commentary on the Meanings of the Prophecies About the Divine Sovereign in the Great Cloud Sutra (Dayunjing Shenhuang Shouji Yishu).

Translated from a late fourth-century version in Sanskrit to Chinese, the original Great Cloud Sutra (Dayunjing) accentuated in Wu's Commentary had fascicles describing a conversation between the Buddha and the Devi of Pure Radiance. In the sutra, the Buddha foretells to Jingguang that he would be a bodhisattva reincarnated in a woman's body in order to convert beings and rule over the territory of a country. Wu's Buddhist supporters meticulously propagated the Commentary "on the eve of her accession to the dragon throne" while seeking to justify the various events that led Wu to occupy the position of Huangdi as a female ruler and bodhisattva. Since gender in the Buddhist Devi worlds have no standard form, Wu later took a further step to transcend her gender limitations by identifying herself as the incarnation of two important male Buddhist divinities, Maitreya and Vairocana. Her narrative was intentionally crafted to persuade the Confucian establishment, circumvent the Five Impediments that restricted women from holding political and religious power, and gain public support.

Sacrifice on Mount Tai 
In relation to Daoism, there are records that point to Wu's participation in important religious rituals, such as the tou long on Mount Song, and feng and shan on Mount Tai. One of the most important rituals was performed in 666. When Emperor Gaozong offered sacrifices to the deities of heaven and earth, Wu, in an unprecedented action, offered sacrifices after him, with Princess Dowager Yan, mother of Gaozong's brother Li Zhen, Prince of Yue, offering sacrifices after her. Wu's procession of ladies up Mount Tai conspicuously linked Wu with the Chinese empire's most sacred traditional rites. Another important performance was made in 700, when Wu conducted the tou long Daoist expiatory rite. Her participation in the rituals had political as well as religious motives. Such ceremonies served to consolidate Wu's life in politics and show she possessed the Mandate of Heaven.

Literature

North Gate Scholars 
Toward the end of Gaozong's life, Wu began engaging a number of mid-level officials who had literary talent, including Yuan Wanqing, Liu Yizhi, Fan Lübing, Miao Chuke, Zhou Simao, and Han Chubin, to write a number of works on her behalf, including the Biographies of Notable Women, Guidelines for Imperial Subjects, and New Teachings for Official Staff Members. Collectively, they became known as the "North Gate Scholars", because they served inside the palace, which was north of the imperial government buildings, and Wu sought advice from them to divert the powers of the chancellors.

The "Twelve Suggestions" 
Around the new year 675, Wu submitted 12 suggestions. One was that the work of Laozi (whose family name was Li and to whom the Tang imperial clan traced its ancestry), Tao Te Ching, should be added to imperial university students' required reading. Another was that a three-year mourning period should be observed for a mother's death in all cases, not just in cases when the father was no longer alive. Emperor Gaozong praised her suggestions and adopted them.

Modified Chinese characters 

In 690, Wu's cousin's son Zong Qinke submitted a number of modified Chinese characters intended to showcase Wu's greatness. She adopted them, and took one of the modified characters, Zhao, to be her formal name (i.e., the name by which the people would exercise naming taboo on).  was made from two other characters: Ming on top, meaning "light" or "clarity", and Kong on the bottom, meaning "sky". The implication appeared to be that she would be like the light shining from the sky. Later that year, after successive petition drives started by the low-level official Fu Youyi began to occur in waves, asking her to take the throne, Emperor Ruizong offered to take the name of Wu as well. On 18 August 690, she approved the requests. She changed the state's name to Zhou, claiming ancestry from the Zhou dynasty, and took the throne as Empress Regnant (with the title Empress Regnant Shengshen, literally "Divine and Sacred Emperor or Empress Regnant"). Ruizong was deposed and made crown prince with the atypical title Huangsi. This thus interrupted the Tang dynasty, and Wu became the first (and only) woman to reign over China as empress regnant.

Poetry 
Wu's court was a focus of literary creativity. Forty-six of Wu's poems are collected in the Quan Tangshi (Collected Tang Poems) and 61 essays under her name are recorded in the Quan Tangwen (Collected Tang Essays). Many of those writings serve political ends, but there is one poem in which she laments her mother after she died and expresses her despair at not being able to see her again.

During Wu's reign, the imperial court produced various works of which she was a sponsor, such as the anthology of her court's poetry known as the Zhuying ji (Collection of Precious Glories), which contained poems by Cui Rong, Li Jiao, Zhang Yue, and others, arranged according to the poets' rank at court. Among the literary developments that took place during Wu's time (and partly at her court) was the final stylistic development of the "new style" poetry of the regulated verse (jintishi), by the poetic pair Song Zhiwen and Shen Quanqi.

Wu also patronized scholars by founding an institute to produce the Collection of Biographies of Famous Women. The development of what is considered characteristic Tang poetry is traditionally ascribed to Chen Zi'ang, one of Wu's ministers.

Literary allusions 

Literary allusions to Wu may carry several connotations: a woman who has inappropriately overstepped her bounds, the hypocrisy of preaching compassion while simultaneously engaging in a pattern of political corruption and vicious behavior. For many centuries, the establishment used Wu as an example of what can go wrong when a woman is in charge.

Such sexist opposition to her was lifted only during the late 1960s, when Mao Zedong's wife Jiang Qing rehabilitated Wu as part of a propaganda campaign to suggest she be considered as a successor to her ailing husband.

In his biography Wu, Jonathan Clements writes that these wildly differing uses of a historical figure often led to contradictory and even hysterical characterizations. Many alleged poisonings and other incidents, such as her daughter's premature death, may have rational explanations that have been twisted by later opponents.

Evaluation

Quotes 
The traditional Chinese historical view of Wu Zetian generally was mixed—admiring her for her abilities in governing the state, but vilifying her for her actions in seizing imperial power. Luo Binwang even wrote along these lines in a declaration during her lifetime, in support of Li Jingye's rebellion. Typical was a commentary by the Later Jin dynasty historian Liu Xu, the lead editor of the Old Book of Tang:

Some of the diversity in terms of points of agreement and even outright divergences in modern evaluations of Wu can be seen in the following quotes by modern non-Chinese authors:

Confucian viewpoints 
Wu Zetian's rise and reign was criticized harshly by Confucian historians, but has been viewed more favorably since the 1950s.

In the early period of the Tang dynasty, because all the emperors were her direct descendants, Wu was evaluated favorably. Commentary in subsequent periods, however, especially the book Zizhi Tongjian compiled by Sima Guang, harshly criticized her. By the period of Southern Song dynasty, when Neo-Confucianism was firmly established as the mainstream political ideology of China, their ideology determined the evaluation of Wu.

Era names

Chancellors during reign 

Wu Zetian had many chancellors during her reign as monarch of her self-proclaimed Zhou dynasty, many of them notable in their own right. (For full list see List of chancellors of Wu Zetian).

Family

Modern depictions

Television 

 Portrayed by Petrina Fung in the 1984 Hong-Kong TV series Empress Wu.
 Portrayed by Angela Pan in the 1985 Taiwanese TV series The Empress of the Dynasty.
 Portrayed by Liu Xiaoqing in the 1995 Chinese TV series Wu Zetian, in the 2007 TV series The Shadow of Empress Wu and in the 2011 TV series Secret History of Empress Wu.
 Portrayed by Gua Ah-leh in the 2000 Chinese TV series Palace of Desire.
 Portrayed by Qin Lan in the 2001 Chinese TV series Love Legend of the Tang Dynasty.
 Portrayed by Alyssa Chia in the 2003 Chinese TV series Lady Wu: The First Empress.
 Portrayed by Lü Zhong in the 2004 Chinese TV series Amazing Detective Di Renjie and its sequels Amazing Detective Di Renjie 2, Amazing Detective Di Renjie 3 and Mad Detective Di Renjie.
 Portrayed by Siqin Gaowa in the 2006 Chinese TV series Wu Zi Bei Ge.
 Portrayed by Yang Geum-seok in 2006–2007 KBS TV series Dae Jo Yeong.
 Portrayed by Rebecca Chan in the 2009 Chinese TV series The Greatness of a Hero.
 Portrayed by Yin Tao, Liu Xiaoqing and Siqin Gaowa in the 2011 Chinese TV series Secret History of Empress Wu.
 Portrayed by Wang Li Ke in the 2011 Chinese TV series Meng Hui Tang Chao.
 Portrayed by Kara Hui in the 2011 Chinese TV series Women of the Tang Dynasty and in the 2015 TV series Heroes of Sui and Tang Dynasties 5.
 Portrayed by Zhang Ting in the 2011 Chinese TV series Beauty World.
 Portrayed by Liu Yuxin in the 2012 Chinese TV series Secret History of Princess Taiping.
 Portrayed by Fan Bingbing in the 2014 Chinese TV series The Empress of China.
 Portrayed by Sheren Tang in the 2014 Chinese TV series Cosmetology High.
 Portrayed by Ruby Lin in the 2014 Chinese TV series Young Sherlock.
 Portrayed by Sophie Wu in the 2015 episode of Horrible Histories.
 Portrayed by Jiao Junyan in the 2017 Chinese TV series Legendary Di Renjie.
 Portrayed by Yong Mei in the 2021 Chinese TV series Luoyang.

Films 

 Portrayed by Gu Lanjun in the 1939 Chinese movie The Empress Wu Tse-tien.
 Portrayed by Li Lihua in the 1963 Hong-Kong movie Empress Wu Tse-Tien.
 Portrayed by Carina Lau in the 2010 Chinese-Hong Kong movie Detective Dee and the Mystery of the Phantom Flame, its prequels Young Detective Dee: Rise of the Sea Dragon in 2013 and Detective Dee: The Four Heavenly Kings in 2018.

Video games 
 Wu appears in the mobile game Fate/Grand Order as an Assassin class servant.
 Wu appears in the turn-based strategy games Civilization II, Civilization V and Civilization VI as a leader of the Chinese civilization.
 Wu appears as a character in the mobile game Law of Creation as a front-row tank.
 Wu appears as a minister earned in the mobile game Call Me Emperor after getting first place in the cross server intimacy event.
 Wu appears in the mobile game Rise Of Kingdoms as a legendary Chinese civilization Commander.
 Wu appears as the highest-paying symbol in Wu Zetian, a slot machine published by Realtime Gaming

Novels 
 Wu is the protagonist, known as Mei, of the historically inspired fiction novel Moon in the Palace and its sequel The Empress of Bright Moon, both by Weina Dai Randel. Both are retellings of her life leading up to becoming Empress Wu.
 Xiran Jay Zhao's debut novel, Iron Widow, is a reimagining of Wu's life. In an interview with Publishers Weekly, Zhao said, "there's no other woman in Chinese history who had a rise through the harem as iconic as hers...  It's been incredibly fun to reimagine her as instead a teenage peasant girl in an intensely misogynistic world who suddenly gains access to giant fighter mechas—how would she change her world?"

See also 

 Chinese characters of Empress Wu
 Imperial consorts of Tang China
 Li Chong
 Longmen Grottoes
 Qianling Mausoleum
 Wu Chengsi
 Wu Sansi
 Yang Zhirou
 Zhuying ji
 Princess Taiping
 Tang Dynasty
 Women in Tang China
 List of Buddha claimants
 Cixi

Explanatory notes

References

Citations

General sources

Further reading 
 
 
  Offers a critical appraisal of many primary sources and includes an appendix comparing fictional accounts.
  A scholarly biography.
 
 
  Explores the life of Empress Wu Zetian and the ways women found to participate in public life, despite the societal constraints of dynastic China.

External links 

|- style="text-align: center;"

 
624 births
705 deaths
7th-century Chinese monarchs
7th-century Chinese poets
7th-century women rulers
7th-century Chinese women writers
8th-century Chinese monarchs
8th-century Chinese poets
8th-century women rulers
8th-century Chinese women writers
Chinese emperors
Chinese women poets
Tang dynasty imperial consorts
Remarried royal consorts
Empresses regnant
Filicides
Tang dynasty Buddhists
Tang dynasty empresses dowager
Tang dynasty empresses
Tang dynasty poets
Women leaders of China
Emperor Taizong of Tang
Usurpers
8th-century Chinese women
8th-century Chinese people
Chinese Buddhist monarchs
Buddhism and women
Chinese concubines
Female regents
Founding monarchs
Chinese reformers